Samvel Petrosyan (born on 27 September 1954) in Yerevan, is a former Soviet football striker. Now is manager who has worked as the coach of several Armenian teams among which FC Pyunik, the Armenia U-21 team and FC Gandzasar Kapan.

He became 1975 Soviet Cup winner playing for FC Ararat Yerevan.

He is currently the sports director of the newly revived FC Kotayk Abovyan.

Coaching career

References 

Soviet footballers
Armenian footballers
Soviet Armenians
Soviet Top League players
FC Ararat Yerevan players
Soviet football managers
Armenian football managers
FC Armavir managers
FC Kotayk Abovyan managers
Malatia Yerevan managers
FC Yerevan managers
FC Kilikia Yerevan managers
FC Spartak Yerevan managers
FC Mika managers
FC Pyunik managers
FC Gandzasar Kapan managers
FC Shirak managers
1954 births
Living people
Footballers from Yerevan
Association football forwards